The 1900–01 Rugby Union County Championship was the 13th edition of England's premier rugby union club competition at the time.

Devon won the competition for the second time defeating Durham in the final.

Final

See also
 English rugby union system
 Rugby union in England

References

Rugby Union County Championship
County Championship (rugby union) seasons